Enoch is an unincorporated community in Clay County, West Virginia, United States. Its post office  is closed.

The community most likely was named after a local family called Enoch family.

References 

Unincorporated communities in West Virginia
Unincorporated communities in Clay County, West Virginia
Charleston, West Virginia metropolitan area